Nicolás Diego Aguirre (born 27 June 1990) is an Argentine footballer who plays for Atlético de Rafaela as a midfielder.

Club career
Born in Chabás, Aguirre graduated from the youth setup of Arsenal de Sarandí and made his first team debut on 9 November 2008, in a 1–0 defeat against Boca Juniors. On 29 March 2010, he scored his first goal for the club in a 1–0 victory against San Lorenzo. In July, he was loaned to second tier club Atlético Rafaela.

After amassing more than 100 appearances for Arsenal, Aguirre moved to Lanús on 12 February 2015 as a replacement for the injured Sebastián Leto. On 12 April, he scored his first goal for the club in a 2–1 victory over Banfield. In June 2016, he suffered a muscle injury in his leg, which ruled him out of play for 1 month. With the signing of Miguel Almirón, his playing time became limited in the 2016 season.

On 2 February 2018, Aguirre moved abroad for the first time and joined Chinese Super League club Chongqing Dangdai Lifan.

On 8 July 2018, Aguirre joined Segunda División side Granada CF, a club also owned by Jiang Lizhang, for one year on a free transfer. He left the club at the end of the season. He remained without club until 19 January 2020, where he signed a deal until June 2021 with Atlético Tucumán.

On 15 September 2021, Aguirre joined Brazilian club Sport Club do Recife. After the move, the club made a mistake and didn't register him, so he couldn't play for the club for the rest of 2021. In February 2021, Aguirre returned to his former club Atlético de Rafaela.

Career statistics

References

External links

1990 births
Living people
Association football midfielders
Argentine footballers
Arsenal de Sarandí footballers
Atlético de Rafaela footballers
Club Atlético Lanús footballers
Chongqing Liangjiang Athletic F.C. players
Granada CF footballers
Atlético Tucumán footballers
Sport Club do Recife players
Argentine Primera División players
Primera Nacional players
Chinese Super League players
Segunda División players
Argentine expatriate footballers
Argentine expatriate sportspeople in China
Argentine expatriate sportspeople in Spain
Argentine expatriate sportspeople in Brazil
Expatriate footballers in China
Expatriate footballers in Spain
Expatriate footballers in Brazil